Phthersigena timorensis is a species of praying mantis native to Timor.

See also
List of mantis genera and species

References

Mantidae
Insects of Timor
Insects described in 1952